Cecilie Feddersen Sandvej (born 13 June 1990) is a Danish professional footballer who plays as a defender for Dijon in the French Division 1 Féminine and the Danish national team

Club career
Sandvej joined Brøndby IF in 2009, having previously played for Horsens SIK and SønderjydskE.

In October 2013 the Perth Glory announced that Sandvej would be with the club for the 2013–2014 season. Sandvej played in all eleven matches for the Glory, who finished in fifth place.

In February 2014, Sandvej signed with the Washington Spirit of the NWSL. She didn't get capped at all during her time in the NWSL and during the summer, she transferred to SC Sand in the Bundesliga.

In 2017, she signed with 1. FFC Frankfurt.

In August 2021, she signed for Birmingham City in the FAWSL.

International career
Sandvej made her senior international debut in July 2009, as a substitute in a 2–1 friendly win over Iceland in Staines, England. She was named in national coach Kenneth Heiner-Møller's Denmark squad for UEFA Women's Euro 2013. In 2017, she was named to Denmark's UEFA Women's Euro 2017 squad.

Honours

Club
Brøndby IF
Winner
 Elitedivisionen: 2010–11, 2011–12, 2012–13
 Danish Women's Cup: 2010–11, 2011–12, 2012–13

References

External links
 
 Profile at fussballtransfers.de
 Profile at soccerdonna.de
 
 Profile at Danish Football Association (DBU)

1990 births
Living people
Danish women's footballers
Denmark women's international footballers
Danish expatriate sportspeople in Germany
Danish expatriate sportspeople in Australia
Danish expatriate sportspeople in France
Perth Glory FC (A-League Women) players
Brøndby IF (women) players
SC Sand players
1. FFC Frankfurt players
Expatriate women's soccer players in Australia
Expatriate women's footballers in Germany
Expatriate women's footballers in France
Women's association football defenders
Washington Spirit players
Frauen-Bundesliga players
A-League Women players
Division 1 Féminine players
FC Fleury 91 (women) players
Women's Super League players
Birmingham City W.F.C. players
UEFA Women's Euro 2017 players